Hamzaoğlu is a Turkish surname. Notable people with the surname include:

 Hamza Hamzaoğlu (born 1970), Turkish footballer
 Hayati Hamzaoğlu (1933–2000), Turkish actor

Turkish-language surnames
Surnames of Turkish origin